Canadians in Pakistan are one of the sizeable Canadian diasporic communities established in Asia. They consist largely (although not exclusively) of Pakistani Canadians who have returned to Pakistan. In 1999 there were over 1,300 Canadians living in Pakistan.

Notable people
 Adnan Sami - Pakistani/Indian singer with Canadian nationality.
 Dawud Wharnsby - singer/songwriter who seasonally resides in Abbottabad
 Sitara Hewitt - Canadian Actress
 Buland Akhtar Rana - Auditor General of Pakistan

See also
 Canada–Pakistan relations

References

 
Pakistan
Immigration to Pakistan